The Best American Poetry 2003, a volume in The Best American Poetry series, was edited by David Lehman and by guest editor Yusef Komunyakaa.

Ron Smith, reviewing the book in The Richmond Times-Dispatch, wrote that Galway Kinnell's When the Towers Fell is "often moving, even if it doesn't manage the fusion of Walt Whitman and T. S. Eliot it aims for." Another poem in the volume focusing on the effects of terrorism is Susan Dickman's Skin. Smith thought the better poems in this edition were by Marilyn Nelson, Rodney Jones, Brigit Pegeen Kelly, Tony Hoagland, and Ted Kooser.

Poets and poems included

See also
 2003 in poetry

Notes

External links
 Web page for contents of the book, with links to each publication where the poems originally appeared
  Review by Jordan Davis at The Constant Critic Web site

Best American Poetry series
2003 poetry books
Poetry
American poetry anthologies